The Dallara F312 is an open-wheel racing car developed by Italian manufacturer Dallara for use in all Formula Three categories. The car has proved to be one of the most popular Formula 3 Chassis ever, with over 53 of the original type having been produced. Even after its successor the Dallara F317 was introduced, the F312 remained widely used, in championships such as the Euroformula Open Championship and the Japanese Formula 3 Championship.

Development history 
The Dallara F312 was designed to meet the new for 2012 FIA Formula 3 regulations, which were much more restrictive compared to previous Formula 3 regulations, and led to reduced downforce levels. Compared to the previous generation Dallara F308, the 312 features a higher monocoque and a lower nose-section than the outgoing model, with the front dampers and springs being placed inside the tub, a first for a Dallara F3 car, alongside a revised aerodynamic package. The car was unveiled at the Masters of Formula 3 event on the 20th of October 2011 at Circuit Zandvoort, in the Netherlands.

References 

Dallara racing cars
Formula Three cars